McCurrie is a surname. Notable people with the surname include:

Alan McCurrie (born 1953), English rugby league player
Paul McCurrie (1929–2010), American lawyer and politician
Steve McCurrie (born 1973), English rugby league player, son of Alan

See also
McCurdie